Michael Tucker (born August 15, 1990),  known professionally as BloodPop (stylized as BloodPop®), is an American musician, record producer, and songwriter. He has previously used the monikers Blood Diamonds, Blood, and Michael Diamond. He is known for writing and producing songs for Lady Gaga, Lily Allen, Britney Spears, Justin Bieber, Madonna, and John Legend. In 2017, he released a collaboration with Bieber, "Friends", as his debut single under the BloodPop moniker.

Life and career 
Tucker was born in Kansas City, Missouri, United States. Tucker studied jazz guitar in school and, under the guidance of Cody Critcheloe of SSION, learned how to produce music in his parents' basement while he studied at the Kansas City Art Institute. He moved to Vancouver in the late 2000s to study video editing and bonded with fellow creatives while frequently DJ'ing at school parties. In his spare time, he continued producing music with Ableton and sporadically released glitchy, multi-layered electropop instrumentals online, eventually catching the attention of Transparent Records and dubstep artist Skrillex's Owsla imprint.  He then relocated to Los Angeles.

After relocating to Los Angeles and using the monikers Blood and Blood Diamonds, Tucker began to make his mark by working with established artists. He collaborated with Grimes (on his debut 2011 EP, Phone Sex, and later on her 2014 track, "Go"), while also being drafted in to officially remix tracks by artists such as Kendrick Lamar, Beyoncé, Ellie Goulding, and Major Lazer. In 2014, he worked alongside fellow producers Avicii and DJ Dahl on Madonna's 13th album. The record, Rebel Heart, was released the following year, with Tucker providing input on the tracks "Devil Pray", "Iconic", and "Body Shop". Tucker also earned a prominent production credit for smash hit, "Sorry", on Purpose, the fourth album by Justin Bieber, in 2015.

Tucker then went on to produce tracks for Britney Spears, Fifth Harmony, and Hana before working on Lady Gaga's 2016 album, Joanne, alongside Mark Ronson and Kevin Parker of Tame Impala. Tucker began operating under the name BloodPop that year, and he rounded off 2016 by producing John Legend's "What You Do to Me". The following year saw him return with a remix of "Little of Your Love" by indie pop trio Haim, as well as a single co-written with Bieber entitled "Friends". 2019 saw Tucker issue the jubilant single "Newman" under the BloodPop moniker, as well as contributing to Post Malone's "Internet".

Tucker executive produced Lady Gaga's sixth studio album, Chromatica, including lead single, "Stupid Love".

Personal life 
Tucker has been dating American songwriter and producer Hana since May 2013. They met in a recording session.

Discography

Singles 
As lead artist

Songwriting and production credits

Awards and nominations

Notes

References 

1990 births
Living people
Remixers
Record producers from Missouri
American multi-instrumentalists
Songwriters from Missouri
Musicians from Kansas City, Missouri
Owsla artists